The Boulton & Paul P.71A was a 1930s British twin-engined all-metal biplane transport aircraft developed by Boulton & Paul Ltd from the unsuccessful P.64 Mailplane to meet an Imperial Airways requirement for a mail plane.

History
The P.71A was the successor to the Boulton & Paul's first attempt to meet the airline requirement, the P.64 Mailplane. The P.71A was lighter, slimmer and longer and used Armstrong Siddeley Jaguar IVA radial piston engines.

Two aircraft were built and delivered to Imperial Airways at Croydon Airport in February 1935. The airline had lost interest in using them as mailplanes, so the two aircraft were converted as VIP transports with 13 removable seats.

G-ACOX
The first aircraft, registered G-ACOX and named Boadicea after the Briton queen of that name, was lost in the English Channel on 25 September 1936 while on an air-mail flight from Croydon to Paris with the loss of the two crew.

G-ACOY
The second aircraft, registered G-ACOY and named Britomart after the literary character of that name, was damaged beyond repair in a landing accident at Haren, Brussels on 25 October 1935.

Operators

Imperial Airways

Specifications

See also

References
Notes

Bibliography

External links

Boulton & Paul P.71A – British Aircraft Directory

P.071A
1930s British mailplanes
Biplanes
Aircraft first flown in 1935
Twin piston-engined tractor aircraft